Stolpersteine is the German name for stumbling blocks collocated all over Europe by German artist Gunter Demnig. They remember the fate of the victims of Nazi Germany being murdered, deported, exiled or driven to suicide. The first Stolpersteine of the Trnavský kraj, the Trnava Region of present-day Slovakia (formerly Czechoslovakia), were collocated in August 2016.

Generally, the stumbling blocks are posed in front of the building where the victims had their last self chosen residence. The name of the Stolpersteine in Slovak is: pamätné kamene, memorial stones.

The lists are sortable; the basic order follows the alphabet according to the last name of the victim.

Dunajská Streda 
On 13 August 2018, three Stolpersteine were collocated in Dunajská Streda. The inscriptions are both in Slovak and in Hungarian language.

Piešťany 
1.065 inhabitants of Piešťany with Jewish roots were murdered in the course of the Shoah. The Stolperstein of Piešťany was posed by Gunter Demnig himself on 6 August 2016.

Smolenice 
The Stolpersteine in Smolenice were posed by Gunter Demnig himself on 6 August 2016.

See also 
 List of cities by country that have stolpersteine

References

External links

 stolpersteine.eu, Demnig's website
 Yad Vashem, Central Database of Shoah Victims' Names

Trnava Region
Stolpersteine
Holocaust commemoration